Timothy Cain is an American video game developer best known as the creator, producer, lead programmer and one of the main designers of the 1997 computer game Fallout. In 2009, he was chosen by IGN as one of the top 100 game creators of all time.

Biography

Early life
Cain went to college at the University of Virginia and to graduate school in California. During this time, he helped out a friend programming a card game named Grand Slam Bridge for CYBRON Corporation which was released in 1986. In 1989, he received a Master's Degree in Computer Science at University of California, Irvine.

Interplay Entertainment
Began as a freelance programmer for Interplay where he worked on the fantasy role-play editor The Bard's Tale Construction Set. After finishing the game in 1991, he was employed full-time at Interplay. For the first time he worked with Leonard Boyarsky, who was a freelance artist at the time, as designer and programmer on the business simulator Rags to Riches: The Financial Market Simulation which was released in 1993.

In 1994 he started for a couple of months as the only employee working on a game which would later become the post-apocalyptic CRPG game Fallout. He lay out the basic concept based on the GURPS system and began programming the isometric game engine. He also took over the producer role from Thomas R. Decker who had to supervise multiple other projects at the time. With a development cycle of three and a half years Fallout was released in 1997. During this time he was also a programming consultant on Stonekeep (1995) and helped out coding Star Trek: Starfleet Academy (1997).

Before leaving Interplay to form his own company in January 1998, he wrote the main story arc as well as helping designing The Den area of Fallout 2. In an interview he criticized the bigger influence from sales/marketing department during Fallout 2 development, saying, "We were losing part of the game to a larger group who had bigger plans for it."

Troika Games

After forming Troika Games with fellow Interplay workers Leonard Boyarsky and Jason D. Anderson in 1998, he worked as a project leader and lead programmer on Arcanum: Of Steamworks and Magick Obscura a steampunk/fantasy an RPG game for Sierra On-Line, Inc. which was released in 2001.

His next game reunited him with Thomas R. Decker, the original Fallout producer. As project leader and lead designer he produced within 20 months the Dungeons & Dragons game The Temple of Elemental Evil for publisher Atari in 2003. While he loved making the game he was disappointed that it did not turn out what he wanted it to be.

After Bethesda secured the Fallout license from Interplay in 2004, Cain expressed disappointment.

Cain had mixed reactions to Fallout 3, praising Bethesda's understanding of Fallout lore as well as the adaptation of "S. P. E. C. I. A. L." system into a FPS-RPG, but criticized the humor and recycling of too many story elements from the earlier Fallout games.

He helped out programming the last Troika game, Vampire: The Masquerade – Bloodlines, a horror RPG for Activision in 2004. He also worked on a post-apocalyptic roleplay game for which he couldn't convince any publisher to fund. As consequence he had to lay off most employees in late 2004 and shut down Troika Games in February 2005.

Carbine Studios
He joined as the programming director at Carbine Studios working on a fantasy MMO game for NCSoft. He was promoted to design director in October 2007. Cain left Carbine Studios in July 2011.

Obsidian Entertainment
In 2011, Tim Cain joined Obsidian Entertainment as senior programmer. He worked on Pillars of Eternity, which was funded through Kickstarter. He was also a co-director for The Outer Worlds.

Personal life
Cain is affected by hereditary color blindness, stating in a Gamasutra interview that he "[can now] see less than half the spectrum of colors". He enjoys cooking, particularly Japanese and Chinese cuisine, and his favorite dishes are garlic chicken fried rice and chicken karaage. Cain married his husband Robert Land on July 14, 2011.

Games

References

External links

 
 Entry at Terra Arcanum

American LGBT people
American video game designers
American video game programmers
Dungeons & Dragons video game designers
Fallout (series) developers
Interplay Entertainment people
Living people
Obsidian Entertainment people
Year of birth missing (living people)